Mounthill is a small village in County Antrim, Northern Ireland, near Larne. In the 2011 Census, it had a population of 114 people. It is situated in the Larne Borough Council area.

References

See also 
 List of villages in Northern Ireland
 List of towns in Northern Ireland

Villages in County Antrim